The 48th Filmfare Awards were held – Mumbai on 21 February 2003.

The ceremony was dominated by Devdas, which received a leading 17 nominations and 11 wins – a record at the time – including Best Film, Best Director (Sanjay Leela Bhansali), Best Actor (Shah Rukh Khan), Best Actress (Aishwarya Rai) and Best Supporting Actress (Madhuri Dixit).

Awards

Main Awards 
{| class="wikitable"
|-
! style="background:#EEDD82; width:50%;"|Best Film
! style="background:#EEDD82; width:50%;"|Best Director
|-
| valign="top" |
DevdasCompanyHumraazKaanteRaaz| valign="top" |Sanjay Leela Bhansali – Devdas Abbas–Mustan – Humraaz
Ram Gopal Verma – Company
Sanjay Gupta – Kaante
Vikram Bhatt – Raaz
|-
! style="background:#EEDD82;"| Best Actor
! style="background:#EEDD82;"| Best Actress
|-
| valign="top" |Shah Rukh Khan – Devdas Ajay Devgan – Company
Amitabh Bachchan – Kaante
Bobby Deol – Humraaz
Vivek Oberoi – Saathiya
| valign="top" |Aishwarya Rai – DevdasAmisha Patel – Humraaz
Bipasha Basu – Raaz
Karisma Kapoor – Shakti
Rani Mukherjee – Saathiya
|-
! style="background:#EEDD82;"| Best Supporting Actor
! style="background:#EEDD82;"| Best Supporting Actress
|-
| valign="top"|Vivek Oberoi – CompanyAmitabh Bachchan – Aankhen
Jackie Shroff – Devdas
Mohanlal – Company
Sanjay Dutt – Kaante
| valign="top"|Madhuri Dixit – DevdasAntara Mali – Company
Kirron Kher – Devdas
Shilpa Shetty – Rishtey
Sushmita Sen – Filhaal
|-
! style="background:#EEDD82;"| Best Comedian
! style="background:#EEDD82;"| Best Villain
|-
| valign="top"|Paresh Rawal – Awara Paagal DeewanaGovinda – Akhiyon Se Goli Maare
Johnny Lever – Humraaz
Mahesh Manjrekar – Kaante
Paresh Rawal – Aankhen
| valign="top"|Ajay Devgan – DeewangeeAkshaye Khanna – Humraaz
Manoj Bajpai – Road
Nana Patekar – Shakti
Shabana Azmi – Makdee
|-
! style="background:#EEDD82;"| Best Male Debut
! style="background:#EEDD82;"| Best Female Debut
|-
|
 Vivek Oberoi – Company|Esha Deol – Koi Mere Dil Se Poochhe|-
! style="background:#EEDD82;"| Best Music Director
! style="background:#EEDD82;"| Best Lyricist
|-
|Saathiya – A. R. Rahman Devdas – Ismail Darbar
Humraaz – Himesh Reshammiya
Kaante – Anand Raj Anand
Raaz – Nadeem-Shravan
|Saathiya – Gulzar – Saathiya Devdas – Ismail Darbar – Dola Re Dola
Humraaz – Sudhakar Sharma – Sanam Mere Humraaz
Humraaz – Sudhakar Sharma – Tune Zindagi Mein Aake
Raaz – Sameer – Aapke Pyaar Mein
|-
! style="background:#EEDD82;"| Best Playback Singer – Male
! style="background:#EEDD82;"| Best Playback Singer – Female
|-
|Saathiya – Sonu Nigam – Saathiya Humraaz – Krishnakumar Kunnath – Bardaasht Nahi Kar Sakta
Humraaz – Kumar Sanu – Sanam Mere Humraaz
Kyaa Dil Ne Kahaa – Shaan – Nikamma
Sur: The Melody of Life – Lucky Ali – Aa Bhi Ja
|Devdas – Kavita Krishnamurthy & Shreya Ghoshal – Dola Re Dola'Devdas – Kavita Krishnamurthy – Maar DaalaDevdas – Shreya Ghoshal – Bairi PiyaHumraaz – Alka Yagnik – Sanam Mere HumraazRaaz – Alka Yagnik – Aapke Pyaar Mein|-
|}

Technical Awards

Special Awards

Critics' Awards

Biggest WinnersDevdas – 11 WinsCompany – 7 WinsSaathiya – 6 WinsThe Legend of Bhagat Singh – 2 WinsDeewangee – 1 WinAwara Paagal Deewana – 1 WinRaaz – 6 NominationsHumraaz – 12 Nominations''

See also
 Filmfare Awards

References

 https://www.imdb.com/event/ev0000245/2003/

Filmfare Awards
2003 Indian film awards

fr:Filmfare Awards 2008